The West Virginia House of Delegates is the lower house of the West Virginia Legislature. Only three states—Maryland, Virginia and West Virginia—refer to their lower house as the House of Delegates.

Organization
Regular sessions begin with an organizational day on the second Wednesday of January of each year. The length of regular session is limited to 60 calendar days. The governor can call for special sessions.

Delegates are elected for terms of two years.

Legislative process
Delegates submit bill proposals to the Office of Legislative Services or legislative staff counsel, who draft the bill. Once the bill draft is approved by the delegate, it is submitted for introduction. Bills then undergo committee review and three readings in the house of origin and then the other house of the state legislature.

An unusual feature of the West Virginia legislative process is that revenue bills can originate in either house. The state constitution also prohibits multiple subjects in a single bill.

If approved by both the West Virginia House of Delegates and the West Virginia Senate, bills are submitted to the governor, who may sign them into law or veto them. State legislators can override the governor's veto of bills with a simple majority vote of both houses, unless the bill is a revenue bill, in which case two-thirds of the members elected to each house are required to override the governor's veto or line-item veto.

Membership

Historical

District organization

Prior to the 1970 Census, districts always respected county lines, with districts always consisting of either a single entire county, or several entire counties.  Beginning with that year, the state began to use smaller geographic areas.

In response to the 2010 Census, the Legislature was required to redistrict, with the Democratic Party in control.  The Republican Party, and groups from the growing eastern panhandle and Putnam County were among those calling for 100 single member districts.  Eventually redistricting was adopted, which divided the state into 67 districts, of which 47 were one-member districts, 11 two-member districts, 6 three-member districts, 2 four-member districts, and 1 five-member district. The five-member district, covering most of Monongalia County, remained among the ten largest multi-member lower house districts in the country.

In response to the 2020 Census, the Legislature was again required to redistrict, this time with the Republican Party in control.  The Legislature abandoned the practice of multi-member districts and divided the state into 100 single member districts.  Each district contains about 1/100th of the state's population, or about 17,500 persons.  These changes took effect with the 2022 election.

Speaker

The Speaker of the House is selected by its members. In contrast to the tradition of the Speaker of the United States House of Representatives, the Speaker must vote unless excused. The House rules state that in some cases, the speaker is not required to vote unless the House is equally divided, or unless the speaker's vote, if given to the minority, will make the division equal. In the latter case, the question is lost.

Members

86th Legislature party leadership

Committee chairs and ranking members

Current members

Notes

See also 

List of speakers of the West Virginia House of Delegates

References

External links

Chronology of Women in the West Virginia Legislature

West Virginia Legislature
State lower houses in the United States